Phytohabitans flavus is a bacterium from the genus Phytohabitans which has been isolated from roots of an orchid in Okinawa Prefecture, Japan.

References 

Micromonosporaceae
Bacteria described in 2012